
Gmina Szydłów is a rural gmina (administrative district) in Staszów County, Świętokrzyskie Voivodeship, in south-central Poland.

Demography 
According to the 2011 Poland census, there were 4,800 people residing in Szydłów Commune, of whom 50.7% were male and 49.3% were female. In the commune, the population was spread out, with 18.1% under the age of 18, 36.8% from 18 to 44, 25.6% from 45 to 64, and 19.5% who were 65 years of age or older.
 Figure 1. Population pyramid of commune in 2010 – by age group and sex

Villages
Gmina Szydłów contains the villages and settlements of Brzeziny, Gacki, Grabki Duże, Jabłonica, Korytnica, Kotuszów, Mokre, Osówka, Potok, Potok Rządowy, Rudki, Stary Solec, Szydłów, Wola Żyzna, Wolica and Wymysłów.

Neighbouring gminas
Gmina Szydłów is bordered by the gminas of Gnojno, Pierzchnica, Raków, Staszów and Tuczępy.

References

External links
Polish official population figures 2006

Szydlow
Staszów County